This is a list of episodes for The Bob Newhart Show, which was originally broadcast on CBS from 1972 to 1978, spanning six seasons and 142 half-hour episodes.

Series overview
The first four seasons were released on DVD by 20th Century Fox, while seasons 5 and 6, along with The Bob Newhart Show: The Complete Series, have been released through Shout! Factory. Seasons 1–3 of the show were also made available for streaming and download in the digital format.

Episodes

Season 1 (1972–73)

Season 2 (1973–74)

Season 3 (1974–75)

Season 4 (1975–76)

Season 5 (1976–77)

Season 6 (1977–78)

References

External links

Bob Newhart Show